Thocnia or Thoknia, or Thocneia or Thokneia (Θώκνεια), was a town of ancient Arcadia in the district Parrhasia, situated upon a height on the river Aminius, which flows into the Helisson (the present Elissonas), a tributary of the Alpheius. The town was said to have been founded by Thocnus, a son of Lycaon, and was deserted in the time of Pausanias (2nd century), as its inhabitants had been removed to Megalopolis.

Its site is located near modern Thoknia, formerly called Bromosellas, and renamed to reflect the association with the ancient town.

References

Populated places in ancient Arcadia
Former populated places in Greece